Zaratha is a genus of moths of the family Agonoxenidae.

Taxonomy
The genus is placed in the family Elachistidae, Agonoxenidae or Blastodacnidae.

Species
 Zaratha crotolitha Meyrick, 1915 (from Australia)
 Zaratha dicellias Meyrick, 1909 (from India)
 Zaratha macrocera (Felder & Rogenhofer, 1875) (from the Amazonas bassin)
 Zaratha mesonyctia Meyrick, 1909 (from Bolivia)
 Zaratha muricicoma Walsingham, 1891 (from Gambia)
 Zaratha plumbilinea (Diakonoff, 1955) (from New Guinea)
 Zaratha prosarista Meyrick, 1909 (from India)
 Zaratha pterodactylella Walker, 1864 (from Colombia and Brazil)
 Zaratha trisecta Meyrick, 1915 (from Australia)

References
Markku Savela's funet.fi 

 
Agonoxeninae
Parametriotinae